G.H. Walker & Co. was an investment banking and brokerage firm founded in 1900 by George Herbert Walker, grandfather and great-grandfather of Presidents George Herbert Walker Bush and George Walker Bush, and located at 1 Wall Street.

Background
The firm was originally based in St. Louis, Missouri.

In July 1973, the firm acquired the securities brokerage business of Laird, Inc.  The company, later known as G.H. Walker, Laird & Co., was sold to White Weld & Co. in October 1974.  White Weld, in turn, was sold to Merrill Lynch in 1978.

Other notable former employees include Bill Donaldson, later founder of Donaldson, Lufkin & Jenrette and chairman of the Securities and Exchange Commission. Bert Walker, later served as chairman and CEO of Stifel Financial in the late 1970s and 1980s.

References

Merrill (company)
Bush family
Former investment banks of the United States
Financial services companies established in 1900
Financial services companies disestablished in 1974
Defunct financial services companies of the United States
1900 establishments in Missouri
1974 disestablishments in New York (state)